The Palo Alto Weekly is a weekly community newspaper in Palo Alto in the U.S. state of California. Owned by Embarcadero Media, it serves Palo Alto, Menlo Park, Atherton, Portola Valley, Stanford, East Palo Alto and Los Altos Hills.

It was established in 1979 as an alternative to the town's daily newspaper, the Peninsula Times Tribune, which ceased publishing in 1993. At that time, the Weekly expanded to twice-a-week. In 1995, a new daily, the Palo Alto Daily News, began publishing. In 2008, a second daily, The Daily Post, began in Palo Alto.

In September 2009, the Weekly reverted to publishing just one day a week, on Fridays.

The Weekly is published by Embarcadero Media. Jocelyn Dong became editor in 2011 (after the retirement of Jay Thorwaldson) and Frank Bravo the webmaster.  In January 1994 the newspaper began to publish all its content on its website, the first newspaper in the United States to do so.  The website includes a classified advertising section (fogster.com) shared among Embarcadero's other publications.  The newspaper is distributed free by mail to essentially all households in its market area. Circulation is approximately 37,000.  It is a member of the Association of Alternative Newsweeklies. They maintain Palo Alto Online and Palo Alto Wiki.

Awards
The paper has won several awards from the California Newspaper Publishers Association.
First Place:  Local News Coverage; Local Breaking-News Story; Feature Story
Second Place:  Feature Story; Environmental Reporting; Sports Coverage; General News Photo; Photo Essay; Freedom of Information

References

External links 
Palo Alto Wiki page

Newspapers published in the San Francisco Bay Area
Palo Alto, California
Publishing companies established in 1979
1979 establishments in California
Weekly newspapers published in California